Shannon Aneal Estenoz is an American environmental activist and government official who is the current assistant secretary of the interior for fish and wildlife and parks in the Biden administration.

Early life and education 
Estenoz is a native of Key West. She earned a Bachelor of Arts degree in international affairs and Bachelor of Science in civil engineering from Florida State University.

Career 
Estenoz previously served as a member of the South Florida Water Management District Governing Board. She also worked for the World Wildlife Fund and National Parks Conservation Association. She most recently worked as the CEO of the Everglades Foundation and served as director of the United States Department of the Interior's Office of Everglades Restoration Initiatives during the Obama administration.

Interior Department Nomination
Estenoz was nominated by President Biden to serve as assistant secretary of the interior for fish and wildlife and parks on April 27, 2021. Hearings on her nomination were held before the Senate's Environment Committee on May 12, 2021. Another hearing was held before the Senate's Energy Committee on May 18, 2021. Both the Environment Committee and Energy Committee favorably reported the nominations on May 26, 2021, and May 27, 2021, respectively. On June 24, 2021, she was confirmed in the United States Senate by voice vote. She was sworn in on July 12, 2021.

Personal life 
Estenoz and her husband, Richard Grosso, have two children. Grosso is an environmental attorney.

References 

Living people
People from Key West, Florida
Florida State University alumni
Obama administration personnel
Biden administration personnel
United States Assistant Secretaries of the Interior
Year of birth missing (living people)